The community of Lethbridge is located  from Clarenville, Newfoundland and Labrador along Route 230, on the Cabot Highway, to Bonavista. Route 233 and Route 234 also pass through the community. It is an unincorporated community with a population of 635 (2016).

Forestry (including pulp and saw mills) is a main industry in the area, as well as the farming of such crops as: potatoes, carrots, turnips, cabbage and various berries. There is limited poultry and beef production.

See also
 List of communities in Newfoundland and Labrador

References 

Populated coastal places in Canada
Populated places in Newfoundland and Labrador